The View from the Inside is an album by American jazz vibraphonist Bobby Hutcherson recorded in 1976 and released on the Blue Note label. The session has been released on CD in 2007 as part of Mosaic Select: Bobby Hutcherson.

Reception 
The Allmusic review by Scott Yanow awarded the album 3 stars stating "Some of the vibist's later Blue Note albums are forgettable but this LP... has some excellent hard bop music. The material is generally melodic but has some fine solos".

Track listing 
All compositions by Bobby Hutcherson except as indicated
 "Later, Even" - 3:51
 "Houston St. Thursday Afternoon" - 6:27
 "Same, Shame" - 10:22
 "Love Can Be Many Things" (James Leary III) - 4:48
 "Song for Annie" (Emanuel Boyd) - 6:29
 "Laugh, Laugh Again" (Leary) - 4:19
 "For Heaven's Sake" (Elise Bretton, Sherman Edwards, Don Meyer) - 6:36
Recorded at Wally Heider Sound Studios in San Francisco, California on August 4 (track 7), August 5 (tracks 1, 3 & 4) and August 6 (tracks 2, 5 & 6), 1976.

Personnel 
 Bobby Hutcherson - vibes
 Emanuel Boyd - tenor saxophone, soprano saxophone
 Larry Nash - piano, electric piano
 James Leary III - bass
 Eddie Marshall - drums

References 

Blue Note Records albums
Bobby Hutcherson albums
1976 albums